The Congress of Michoacán is the state legislature of Michoacán, a state of Mexico. The Congress is unicameral.

See also
List of Mexican state congresses

External links

Government of Michoacán
Michoacan
Michoacan